Somerset County is the southernmost county in the U.S. state of Maryland. As of the 2020 census, the population was 24,620, making it the second-least populous county in Maryland. The county seat is Princess Anne.

The county was named for Mary, Lady Somerset, the wife of Sir John Somerset and daughter of Thomas Arundell, 1st Baron Arundell of Wardour (c. 1560–1639). She was also the sister of Anne Calvert, Baroness Baltimore (1615–1649), who later lent her name to Anne Arundel County, which was erected in 1650 as the Province of Maryland's third county.

Somerset County is located on the state's Eastern Shore. It is included in the Salisbury, MD-DE Metropolitan Statistical Area.

The University of Maryland Eastern Shore is located in Princess Anne.

History

Initial settlements
Somerset County was settled and established by English colonists in part due to a response to the Province/Dominion of Virginia passing a law in 1659/1660 requiring Quakers in the colony to convert to Anglicanism or leave the colony. A group of Virginia Quakers living in Accomack County, Virginia, on the southern tip of what later became known as the Delmarva Peninsula, petitioned Charles Calvert, third Lord Baltimore in 1661 to migrate to the Eastern Shore of Maryland to the territory under his governance. The governor considered this an opportunity to fortify the borders of his territory on the Delmarva Peninsula against the pressing encroachment of the Virginians.

The Royal Charter that Lord Baltimore had received from King Charles I in 1632 had granted Maryland the land north of the entire length of the Potomac River up to the 40th parallel. Later surveys authorized by Baltimore on the Eastern Shore of the Chesapeake Bay indicated that the southern boundary would continue across the peninsula at the mouth of the Pocomoke River. It was marked on the north shore by a rock outcropping labelled as "Watkins' Point". The Virginian Quakers settled just north of that point, on the southern bank of the Annemessex River in November 1662, A separate group of Anglican Virginian settlers were granted permission to make another settlement, further north along the Manokin River.

In conjunction with the two new settlements, Lord Baltimore set up a three-man commission for the Eastern Shore territory, made up of two Marylanders and one Virginian. Its purpose was ostensibly to oversee the territory, found new settlements, and maintain a detailed recording of all land and civic transactions in the area. Lord Baltimore intended to use the commission to reinforce Maryland's claim to the area and to monitor any encroachments by Virginians.

Invasion from Virginia
The Assembly tried to secure the allegiance to Virginia of all settlers south of the Wicomico River including the Annemessex and Manokin settlements. In early October 1663, a militia from Accomac County, Virginia led by a Colonel Edmund Scarborough arrived at the Annemessex settlement. They attempted to secure oaths of allegiance under threat of arrest and property confiscation. Scarborough was also on a personal mission to arrest Stephen Horsey (born on Isle of Wight, England and immigrated to Northampton, Virginia, 1643), the leader of the anti-tax movement and a vocal critic of the colonial government. He along with fellow Northampton County residents William Coulborne, Randall Revell, and Ambrose Dixon signed the Tricesimo die Marty 1651.

Scarborough and his force of 40 mounted men reached Horsey's new residence on October 11, 1663, and presented the Commands of the Assembly of Virginia against him. Horsey was "arrested" by Scarborough, but Horsey refused to accompany the party back to Virginia, declaring that he was going to remain in Maryland and maintain allegiance to the King and Lord Baltimore. The settlers expelled Scarborough and his force from the settlement. The company moved on to the Manokin Settlement, where they were received much more favorably. Although the Anglican settlers there were willing to swear allegiance to the Virginia colonial government, they were not willing to take any action against Lord Baltimore's government. Scarborough returned to Virginia without success in taking over southern Somerset County for Virginia.

Early county leaders
The new settlers established a government for Calvert County, the eighth in the Province of Maryland; it was formed from the southern part of Kent County. This had been organized in 1642 as the Province's second county, encompassing the entire Eastern Shore of the Chesapeake. Horsey was selected to sit on the first county court, which administered the new county. Charles Calvert appointed Stephen Horsey on December 11, 1665, along with Captain William Thorne, William Stevens, George Johnson, John Winder, James Jones and Henry Boston. Horsey sat as a regular member of the Somerset County Court through the winter and spring of 1666. He traveled across the Chesapeake Bay in 1665 with Captain Thorne to meet with Charles Calvert, who swore them in as county commissioners. Horsey established himself as a nonconformist and someone willing to stand up for his beliefs.

Boundary disputes with Delaware

County boundary disputes continued, including of the northern boundary. Baltimore believed his Eastern Shore territory extended to the top of the peninsula, where the Delaware River meets the Bay. In the 1680s, William Penn, founder of Pennsylvania, claimed this territory as his own, based on a conflicting deed. Penn, Baltimore, and their heirs began a protracted legal battle to determine the boundaries. Their compromise was to split the Delmarva Peninsula; however, they disagreed as to whether the boundary line should be drawn at the location of Cape Henlopen or at Fenwick Island. There were few settlers in the frontier on either side to take issue. That boundary would finally be settled in 1763 when surveyors Charles Mason and Jeremiah Dixon incorporated the Transpeninsular Line (Mason–Dixon line) as the definitive boundary between Delaware and Maryland.

Settlement growth
The territory continued to attract new settlers, primarily from Virginia, and by 1666, the territory had met the requirements to become established as a county in the province with its own local government. On August 22, 1666, Lord Baltimore issued a proclamation establishing the new county, including the establishment of a complete civil and military organization. The proclamation established a sheriff and a military commander for the county, and five surveyors charged with laying out a highway to serve the county. In January 1667, the county administration laid out the five initial districts, designated as "Hundreds", into which the county would be divided. Additional hundreds were added as additional knowledge of the area was surveyed.

Religious communities
Settlement of the county generally proceeded from the Chesapeake Bay eastward, and from old Accomack County northward. The original settlers in the first two settlements were Quakers and Anglicans; and both groups continued to grow from ongoing immigration from the northern portions of the Virginia colony. In the 1670s, Scottish and Irish Presbyterians began to immigrate to the county, some from Virginia, some from the British Isles. In December 1680, a prominent member of the county and professed Anglican, William Stevens of Rehoboth settlement, sent a request to the Presbytery of Laggan in northern Ireland to consider sending a Presbyterian minister to Somerset county; and the first Presbyterian (Reformed) minister, Reverend Francis Makemie, arrived in early 1683, quickly followed by a growing list of additional Irish Presbyterian ministers and missionaries. The towns of Rehoboth and Snow Hill along the Pocomoke River in the eastern (seaside) portion of Somerset County became Presbyterian centers in the County.  The work of these Presbyterian ministers and missionaries eventually led to the organization of the Presbytery in Philadelphia in 1706, the forerunner of American Presbyterianism.

In 1689, the "Glorious Revolution" of 1688 in England resulted in the exile of the Roman Catholic King James II. After conquest by invasion, the Protestant Dutch rulers William of Orange-Nassau and Mary of Orange (James II's Protestant daughter) later became King William III, (1650–1702) and Queen Mary II. The "Protestant Revolution" of 1689 in Maryland overthrew the Roman Catholic government, resulting in the reversion of Lord Baltimore's proprietary charter. The Province was converted into a Royal colony (with a later government controlled by the king and his ministers). The capital was moved from the Catholic stronghold at St. Mary's City in southern Maryland to the more central, newly renamed Annapolis on the western shore of the Chesapeake Bay, opposite Kent Island.

In 1692, the Provincial General Assembly established the Church of England as the "established church" of the Province. This put pressure on the Quakers and Presbyterians, who were excluded from political office for a period. Their numbers in the county began a slow decline until the American Revolution.

For more than a century, the county and much of the colony were developed by planters, with the labor of enslave Africans, for tobacco as a commodity crop. For many years they prospered, but tobacco exhausted the soil. By the early 19th century, after the American Revolutionary War, some planters turned to mixed farming. The Eastern Shore remained primarily rural and steeped in slave society culture. Other parts of Maryland had an increasing proportion of free people of color, and more than half the blacks in the state were free before the Civil War.

Native Americans
As the English colonies expanded, they encroached on Native American land. The coastal areas were occupied primarily by Algonquian language-speaking tribes. The population of the latter decreased, due to disease, warfare and social disruption. Some of the tribes migrated west to the Ohio River Valley or joined with  neighboring tribes to the north, such as the Lenape.

Some of the descendants of the tribes of Maryland remained. They intermarried with colonists, including white indentured servants, and African and African-American enslaved workers. Children of Native American mothers were generally absorbed and grew up in their culture, even if mixed-race. The Catholic Church recorded Native American families in southern Maryland. In the late 20th century, many groups of Native American began to reorganize, noting their community continuity. Several tribes have been recognized by the state.

Subsequent counties
After the Dutch Anglo war, The Dutch loss the North & South Rivers (Hudson & Delaware). The Dutch colony (2 miles X 20 miles) along the Delaware Bay, became Durham County Maryland, With the county seat being Lewes, 1665 until 1669. In 1669 it became part of Somerset County until 1683 when it given to William Penn.

In 1742, Worcester County to the east and the ocean, was organized as the thirteenth county of Maryland by separation from Somerset County. By 1867, portions of Somerset and Worcester counties were ceded to create a 22nd jurisdiction, Wicomico County. (The state in 1872 created a 23rd and final county in the far mountainous west, named Garrett.)

The county has a number of properties on the National Register of Historic Places.

Geography

Adjacent counties
Wicomico County (north)
Accomack County, Virginia (south)
Dorchester County (northwest)
Worcester County (east)
Saint Mary's County (west)

State protected area
The State of Maryland Deal Island Wildlife Management Area, a protected area, is in the northwest quadrant of the county. It incorporates not only Deal Island but the tributaries of the Chesapeake Bay.

Climate
The county has a humid subtropical climate (Cfa) with all months significantly above freezing, seven to eight months greater than 50 °F (10 °C,) and three months greater than 22 °C (71.6 °F.) The hardiness zones are 7b and 8a.

Demographics

2020 census

Note: the US Census treats Hispanic/Latino as an ethnic category. This table excludes Latinos from the racial categories and assigns them to a separate category. Hispanics/Latinos can be of any race.

2010 census
As of the 2010 United States Census, there were 26,470 people, 8,788 households, and 5,478 families residing in the county. The racial makeup of the county was 53.5% white, 42.3% black or African American, 0.7% Asian, 0.3% American Indian, 1.4% from other races, and 1.7% from two or more races. Those of Hispanic or Latino origin made up 3.3% of the population. In terms of ancestry, 13.3% were German, 11.5% were English, 9.2% were American, and 8.3% were Irish.

Of the 8,788 households, 27.7% had children under the age of 18 living with them, 42.1% were married couples living together, 15.3% had a female householder with no husband present, 37.7% were non-families, and 31.5% of all households were made up of individuals. The average household size was 2.37 and the average family size was 2.91. The median age was 36.5 years.

The median income for a household in the county was $42,443 and the median income for a family was $49,759. Males had a median income of $39,307 versus $33,067 for females. The per capita income for the county was $16,919. About 12.7% of families and 18.6% of the population were below the poverty line, including 27.0% of those under age 18 and 12.6% of those age 65 or over.

2000 census
As of the census of 2000, there were 24,747 people, 8,361 households, and 5,444 families residing in the county. There were 10,055 housing units at an average density of 31 per square mile (12/km2). The racial makeup of the county was 56.4% White, 41.1% Black or African American, 0.4% Native American, 0.5% Asian, 0% Pacific Islander, 0.5% from other races, and 1.2% from two or more races. 1.3% of the population were Hispanic or Latino of any race. The largest ancestry groups in the County are Black or African American (41%), English American (16%), German (8%), Irish (8%) and Italian (1%) ancestry.

There were 8,361 households, out of which 38.30% had children under the age of 18 living with them, 46.1% were married couples living together, 15.1% had a female householder with no husband present, and 34.9% were non-families. 15.3% of all households were made up of individuals, and 7.2% had someone living alone who was 65 years of age or older. The average household size was 2.37 and the average family size was 2.92.

In the county, the population was spread out, with 18.5% under the age of 18, 15.7% from 18 to 24, 29.5% from 25 to 44, 22.2% from 45 to 64, and 14.2% who were 65 years of age or older. The median age was 36.5 years. For every 100 females, there were 114.6 males. For every 100 females age 18 and over, there were 119.1 males.

The median income for a household in the county was $29,903, and the median income for a family was $37,643. Males had a median income of $27,496 versus $23,035 for females. The per capita income for the county was $15,965. About 15.0% of families and 20.1% of the population were below the poverty line, including 28.4% of those under age 18 and 19.1% of those age 65 or over.

Politics and government

Presidential elections 
In presidential elections, Somerset is a swing county that typically votes Republican. In 2012, it was one of only a handful of Southern counties to switch from the Republican McCain to the Democratic Obama, though in 2016 it swung strongly in favor of Donald Trump. In 2020, Somerset shifted even more toward Trump, the only county in Maryland to trend this way, in spite of Maryland as a whole voting more Democratic; Biden won Talbot and Frederick counties, two counties that were formerly solidly Republican in presidential elections. It has voted for every incumbent President seeking re-election since Truman in 1948 (Trump in 2020, Obama in 2012, Bush in 2004, Clinton in 1996, H.W. Bush in 1992, Reagan in 1984, Carter in 1980, Nixon in 1972, Johnson in 1964, and Eisenhower in 1956) the longest such streak in the nation.

|}

County commissioners 
Somerset County is governed by county commissioners, the traditional form of county government in Maryland. Somerset County Commissioners are elected to four-year terms; all current commissioners' terms will expire in 2022.

Sheriffs
Stephen Horsey was appointed by the Governor of Maryland as the first sheriff of Somerset County on August 22, 1666, and the Somerset County Sheriff's Office celebrated its 300th anniversary in 2011. The current sheriff is Ronald Howard (Republican), who has been serving as sheriff since 2014.

Communities

City
Crisfield

Town
Princess Anne (county seat)

Census-designated places
The Census Bureau recognizes the following census-designated places (CDPs) in the county:

Chance
Dames Quarter
Deal Island
Eden
Fairmount
Frenchtown-Rumbly
Mount Vernon historically known in parts as Hog's Neck, Cow Island or Jason
Smith Island
West Pocomoke

Unincorporated communities

Ewell
Kingston
Manokin
Marion Station
Oriole
Rehobeth
Rhodes Point
Shelltown
Tylerton
Upper Fairmount
Upper Falls
Wenona
Westover

See also
National Register of Historic Places listings in Somerset County, Maryland

References

External links
Somerset County Library
Your Community Link: A Database of Community, Government, and Non-Profit organizations on the Lower Shore

 

 
Maryland counties
1666 establishments in Maryland
Salisbury metropolitan area
Populated places established in 1666
Maryland counties on the Chesapeake Bay